Gaspare Charles "Gap" Mangione (born July 31, 1938) is a jazz pianist from Rochester, New York. He is the brother of Chuck Mangione.

Career
In 1958, Mangione and his brother started performing together as the Mangione Brothers Sextet/Quintet. From 1960–1961 they recorded three albums for Riverside as the Jazz Brothers.

In 1968, Mangione released his first solo album, Diana in the Autumn Wind, with drummer Steve Gadd and bassist Tony Levin in their first recordings, and compositions and arrangements by Chuck Mangione.

In 2004, Mangione received the Artist of the Year Award from the Arts & Cultural Council for Greater Rochester.

In 2015, Mangione was inducted into the Rochester Music Hall of Fame.

Discography

As leader or co-leader
 The Jazz Brothers as the Mangione Brothers Sextet with Chuck Mangione (Riverside, 1960)
 Hey Baby! as the Jazz Brothers with Chuck Mangione (Riverside, 1961)
 Spring Fever as the Jazz Brothers with Chuck Mangione, Sal Nistico (Riverside, 1961)
 Diana in the Autumn Wind (GRC, 1968) reissued on CD 2003
 Sing Along Junk (Mercury, 1972)
 ...And the Kids Call It Boogie (Sagoma, 1974)
 She and I (A&M, 1974) 
 Gap Mangione! (A&M, 1976) 
 Suite Lady with Larry Carlton (A&M, 1978)
 Dancin' Is Making Love with Larry Carlton (A&M, 1979)
 The Boys from Rochester with Chuck Mangione, Steve Gadd, Joe Romano, Frank Pullara (Feels So Good, 1989)
 Planet Gap with the Big Band (Cafe/Josh Music, 1997)
 Stolen Moments with the Big Band (Josh Music, 2003)
 Family Holidays (Josh Music, 2004)
 Live in Toronto (Josh Music, 2015)

As sideman or guest 
With Chuck Mangione
 Friends and Love (Mercury, 1970)
 Together: A New Chuck Mangione Concert (Mercury, 1971)
 Land of Make Believe (Mercury, 1973)
 Chase the Clouds Away (A&M, 1975)
 Bellavia (A&M, 1975)
 Tarantella (A&M, 1980)

With others
 Dixieland at the Roundtable, Salt City Six (Roulette, 1958)
 Wilmer and the Dukes, Wilmer & the Dukes (Aphrodisiac, 1969)
 Once I Loved, Esther Satterfield (Sagoma, 1974; reissued on A&M)

Sampled by major rappers
 A Tribe Called Quest
 Chance the Rapper 
 Ghostface Killah  
 Guerilla Black 
 Jadakiss 
 Jaylib
 Kendrick Lamar 
 People Under the Stairs
 Slum Village
 Styles P
 Swizz Beatz
 Talib Kweli

References

External links

1938 births
20th-century American pianists
American jazz pianists
American male pianists
American jazz bandleaders
American people of Italian descent
Living people
Musicians from Rochester, New York
People from Greece, New York
Jazz musicians from New York (state)
Syracuse University alumni
21st-century American pianists
20th-century American male musicians
21st-century American male musicians
American male jazz musicians
Mangione family